The 1897 USFSA Football Championship was the 4th staging of the USFSA Football Championship.

It was played on neutral grounds, in a league system with Standard Athletic Club being proclaimed champions of France after beating The White Rovers in a play-off title decider having finished level on 14 points.

Table

Play-off
This championship was extremely competitive, in fact, it resulted in a draw as Standard AC and The White Rovers finished tied on 14 points, which meant that the title had to be decided in a playoff match that was held a few days later.

Standard AC beat White Rovers 3–2, but the result of that game was canceled and the game had to be replayed. Despite the second chance, however, Rovers did not show up to play this game, and Standard was proclaimed champions of France.

Replay

Winner

References

External links
RSSSF

USFSA Football Championship
1
France